Mosheim may refer to:

Locations
Mosheim, Tennessee
Mosheim, Texas

People
Mosheim Feaster (1867–1950), American soldier
Grete Mosheim (1905–1986), German actress
Johann Lorenz von Mosheim (1693–1755), German Lutheran church historian
Samuel Mosheim Schmucker (1823–1863), American historical writer and biographer